Lehigh is a city in Coal County, Oklahoma, United States. The population was 356 at the 2010 census.

History
Lehigh began as the first mining camp in what is now Coal County, Oklahoma. At the time of its founding Lehigh was located in Atoka County, Choctaw Nation. It was originally named Boone, but the name was changed to Lehigh. The new name was taken from Lehigh County, Pennsylvania, a coal mining region. 

A post office opened in Lehigh, Indian Territory on April 4, 1882, and several railroads built lines to Lehigh, including the Missouri, Kansas and Texas Railway, the Chicago, Rock Island and Pacific Railway, and the Gulf, Colorado and Santa Fe Railway.  During the late-19th and early-20th centuries, Lehigh was a growing settlement which greatly profited from the coal mines surrounding it. During the 1910s and 1920s, the demand for coal lessened as railroads switched to oil-powered trains. The mines eventually closed, and in the early 1920s, boll weevils destroyed the cotton crops in the area. Many businesses closed, and people left the town. The Merchants National Bank Building in Lehigh is the only structure that remains from the once prosperous downtown area.

Geography
Lehigh is located in southeastern Coal County at  (34.470084, -96.218578). U.S. Route 75 passes through the city, leading north  to Coalgate, the county seat, and southeast  to Atoka.

Demographics

At the 2000 census, there were 315 people, 114 households and 77 families residing in the city. The population density was 199.9 people per square mile (77.0/km). There were 144 housing units at an average density of 91.4 per square mile (35.2/km). The racial makeup of the city was 76.51% White, 0.95% African American, 14.92% Native American, 0.95% Asian, and 6.67% from two or more races. Hispanic or Latino of any race were 1.27% of the population.

There were 114 households, of which 29.8% had children under the age of 18 living with them, 50.9% were married couples living together, 10.5% had a female householder with no husband present, and 31.6% were non-families. 24.6% of all households were made up of individuals, and 8.8% had someone living alone who was 65 years of age or older. The average household size was 2.76 and the average family size was 3.26.

28.9% of the population were under the age of 18, 9.2% from 18 to 24, 26.7% from 25 to 44, 21.3% from 45 to 64, and 14.0% who were 65 years of age or older. The median age was 35 years. For every 100 females, there were 111.4 males. For every 100 females age 18 and over, there were 101.8 males.

The median household income was $24,16, and the median family income was $25,156. Males had a median income of $20,278 compared with $17,344 for females. The per capita income was $10,699. About 18.8% of families and 27.7% of the population were below the poverty line, including 37.8% of those under age 18 and 12.5% of those age 65 or over.

Climate

Notable people 
 Rube Foster, baseball player who won two World Series championships with the Boston Red Sox in 1915 and 1916
 Patrick J. Hurley, U.S. Secretary of War from 1929 to 1933
 Benjamin Franklin Smallwood, Principal Chief of Choctaw Nation from 1888 to 1890
 Muriel Hazel Wright, historian, born here in 1889

Notes

See also

 List of municipalities in Oklahoma

References

External links

Cities in Oklahoma
Cities in Coal County, Oklahoma